is a Japanese singer, dancer and actor. He is a member of the J-Pop group The Rampage from Exile Tribe and represented with LDH.

Early life 
Kazuma Kawamura was born on January 7, 1997, in Osaka, Japan. Since his childhood he had dreamed of appearing on television. Initially, Kawamura wanted to become an actor but after a close friend of his lent him an Exile album during his third grade of junior high school, he was so impressed by the group, especially their vocalist Takahiro, that he changed his goals. Ever since, he aspired to become a professional singer. With the support of his parents and the ambition to learn how to sing, he transferred from a normal high school to a music school later on. He was then scouted by EXPG Osaka  during an LDH seminar and became a scholarship student there.

Career 
Inspired by Exile and convinced LDH was the only way to achieve his dream of becoming a singer, Kawamura took part in the VOCAL BATTLE AUDITION 4 - For Young People with Dreams in April 2014 as his first audition. Ultimately, he passed the audition as one of three winners out of 30 thousand contestants alongside Hokuto Yoshino and Riku Aoyama and became a vocal candidate for THE RAMPAGE. In September of the same year, he was chosen as an official member of the group.

In January 2017, The Rampage from Exile Tribe made their debut with the single "Lightning".

In October 2018, he made his acting debut in the TV drama Prince of Legend, playing the role "Team Kyogoku Brothers'" prince Ryu Kyogoku. On February 14, 2019, he attended the PRINCE OF LEGEND PREMIUM LIVE SHOW, a fan-meeting with the whole Prince of Legend cast, at Yokohama Arena. There, he performed "Take on Me", a cover of A-ha's 80s hit and insert song of the show, alongside Nobuyuki Suzuki who played the other Kyogoku brother. On September 7 in the same year, Kawamura was invited to the 29th Tokyo Girls Collection (Autumn/Winter) at Saitama Super Arena together with the main cast of the movie High & Low The Worst in which he stars as Fujio Hanaoka. This marked the first time he attended any fashion related event and walked a runway in his career. A few months after, he also appeared at the 30th Tokyo Girls Collection (Spring/Summer) alongside the main cast of the movie Kizoku Tanjou -Prince Of Legend-.

On June 23, 2020, his first photo essay titled SINCERE will be released.

Personal life 
Kawamura practiced Karate for 11 years starting in his first year of elementary school.

He is one of the members of a Krump dance crew "Rag Pound" with fellow members Kaisei Takechi and Makoto Hasegawa.

Works

Participating works

Lyrics

Filmography

TV Dramas

Films

Game

Bibliography

Photo essay

References

External links 
 The Rampage Official Website

21st-century Japanese singers
1997 births
21st-century Japanese male actors
Japanese male dancers
LDH (company) artists
Living people
Musicians from Osaka Prefecture
People from Osaka Prefecture
21st-century Japanese male singers